The first season of the American television drama series Breaking Bad premiered on January 20, 2008 and concluded on March 9, 2008. It consisted of seven episodes, each running approximately 48 minutes in length, except the pilot episode which runs for approximately 58 minutes. AMC broadcast the first season on Sundays at 10:00 pm in the United States. The first season was originally going to consist of nine episodes, but was reduced to seven by the 2007–2008 Writers Guild of America strike. The complete first season was released on Region 1 DVD on February 24, 2009 and Region A Blu-ray on March 16, 2010.

Cast

Main 
 Bryan Cranston as Walter White, a high school chemistry teacher in Albuquerque, New Mexico, who also works at a local car wash to support his family's income. After being diagnosed with terminal lung cancer, Walt enters the Albuquerque drug world, adopting the pseudonym "Heisenberg".
 Anna Gunn as Skyler White, Walt's pregnant wife and a struggling creative writer.
 Aaron Paul as Jesse Pinkman, a laid-back, small-time drug dealer and cook who enters a partnership with Walt, his former chemistry teacher in high school.
 Dean Norris as Hank Schrader, Walt and Skyler's brother-in-law and a DEA agent.
 Betsy Brandt as Marie Schrader, Skyler's sister and Hank's wife. She is a radiologic technologist.
 RJ Mitte as Walter White Jr., Walt and Skyler's only child who has cerebral palsy. He has a strained relationship with his father.

Recurring 
 Steven Michael Quezada as Steven Gomez
 Carmen Serano as Principal Carmen Molina
 Maximino Arciniega as Krazy-8 Molina
 Charles Baker as Skinny Pete
 Raymond Cruz as Tuco Salamanca
 Jessica Hecht as Gretchen Schwartz
 Tess Harper as Mrs. Pinkman	
 Matt L. Jones as Badger	
 Rodney Rush as Combo	
 Marius Stan as Bogdan Wolynetz

Episodes

Music 
Breaking Bads original score is composed by Dave Porter. The show also uses music from other recording artists with music supervision by Thomas Golubić. Select songs from Season 1 are featured on the Breaking Bad Soundtrack available through iTunes and Amazon.

Home video releases 
The first season was released on DVD in Region 1 on February 24, 2009, in Region 2 on December 14, 2009, and in Region 4 on July 8, 2009. It was released on Blu-ray in Region A on March 16, 2010. Special features on the DVD and Blu-ray include two audio commentaries—"Pilot" by creator Vince Gilligan, cast members Bryan Cranston, Anna Gunn, Aaron Paul, Dean Norris, Betsy Brandt, and RJ Mitte, and editor Lynne Willingham and "Crazy Handful of Nothin'" by Vince Gilligan, Bryan Cranston, Anna Gunn, Aaron Paul, Dean Norris, and writer George Mastras; "The Making of Breaking Bad"; "Inside Breaking Bad"; AMC Shootout – Interview with Vince Gilligan, Bryan Cranston, and Mark Johnson; deleted scenes; screen tests; and Vince Gilligan's photo gallery.

Reception

Reviews
On review aggregator Rotten Tomatoes, the series' first season has an approval rating of 86% based on 43 reviews, with an average rating of 8.3/10. The site's critics consensus reads: "Though at times it feels forced and its imagery can be gruesome, Breaking Bad is darkly gripping and features a strong sympathetic lead in Bryan Cranston." The first season of Breaking Bad also received generally favorable reviews on Metacritic, scoring a 73 out of 100. New York Post critic Linda Stasi praised the series, particularly the acting of Cranston and Paul, stating "Cranston and Paul are so good, it's astounding. I'd say the two have created great chemistry, but I'm ashamed to say such a cheap thing." Robert Bianco of USA Today also praised Cranston and Paul, exclaiming "There is humor in the show, mostly in Walt's efforts to impose scholarly logic on the business and on his idiot apprentice, a role Paul plays very well. But even their scenes lean toward the suspenseful, as the duo learns that killing someone, even in self-defense, is ugly, messy work."

Awards and nominations
The first season received numerous awards and nominations, including four Primetime Emmy Award nominations with two wins. Bryan Cranston won for Outstanding Lead Actor in a Drama Series and Lynne Willingham won for Outstanding Single-Camera Picture Editing for a Drama Series. Vince Gilligan was nominated for Outstanding Directing for a Drama Series for the pilot episode and John Toll was nominated for Outstanding Cinematography for a One-Hour Series for the pilot episode. Cranston also won a Satellite Award for Best Actor in a Drama Series. The series was nominated for Outstanding New Program of the Year at the Television Critics Association Awards. The series also received three Writers Guild of America Award nominations with one win. It was nominated for Best New Series, Patty Lin was nominated for Best Episodic Drama for "Gray Matter", and Vince Gilligan won for Best Episodic Drama for his work on the pilot.

Notes

References

External links 
 
 

 
2008 American television seasons
1
Television series set in 2008